The Cuban chimaera (Chimaera cubana) is a species of fish in the family Chimaeridae. It is found in Colombia, Cuba, and Puerto Rico. Its natural habitat is open seas. It is threatened by habitat loss.

References

Chimaera
Fish described in 1936
Fish of Cuba
Taxonomy articles created by Polbot